Předín is a municipality and village in Třebíč District in the Vysočina Region of the Czech Republic. It has about 700 inhabitants.

Administrative parts
The village of Hory is an administrative part of Předín.

References

Villages in Třebíč District